

Friedrich von Scotti (3 May 1889 – 16 July 1969) was a general in the Wehrmacht of Nazi Germany during World War II.  He was a recipient of the Knight's Cross of the Iron Cross.

Awards and decorations
 German Cross in Gold on 12 November 1942 as Generalleutnant and commander of 227. Infanterie-Division
 Knight's Cross of the Iron Cross on 8 June 1943 as Generalleutnant and commander of 227. Infanterie-Division

References

Citations

Bibliography

 
 

1889 births
1969 deaths
German Army personnel of World War I
Lieutenant generals of the German Army (Wehrmacht)
Recipients of the Knight's Cross of the Iron Cross
People from Offenbach am Main
Military personnel from Hesse
German Army generals of World War II
Recipients of the Gold German Cross